Lillian Roxon (8 February 1932 – 10 August 1973) was a noted Australian journalist and author, best known for Lillian Roxon's Rock Encyclopedia (1969).

From Italy to Australia, then the USA
She was born Lillian Ropschitz in Alassio, Province of Savona, Italy. Her family, originally from Lwów in Ukraine, then Poland, moved to the coastal town of Alassio in Italy, where Lillian was born.

As the Ropschitz family were Jewish, they migrated to Australia in 1937 to escape the rise of fascism, and they settled in Brisbane. Shortly after their arrival, the family anglicised their names; the surname Roxon was Lillian's suggestion.

She studied at the University of Queensland, where she met and had a brief affair with Zell Rabin, who gave Lillian her first job in America and who became a key associate of Rupert Murdoch in the early 1960s. She pursued further studies at the University of Sydney from 1949, where she fell in with the freewheeling movement known as the Sydney Push, then congregating at the Lincoln Inn.

In the process, she attracted the attention of an ASIO operative and was "reported on 25-6-51 as a communist sympathiser". She began her career in newspapers in Sydney and for several years worked for the tabloid magazine Weekend, owned by newspaper magnate Sir Frank Packer and edited by renowned author Donald Horne.

In 1959 she moved permanently to New York, becoming the first Australian female overseas correspondent and the first Australian journalist to establish a high profile in the U.S. From 1962 onward, she was the New York correspondent for The Sydney Morning Herald and over the next ten years she carved out a singular career reporting on arts, entertainment and women's issues for the Australian, American and British press.

1960s
In the mid-1960s Roxon became fascinated by pop music and the rise of groups like The Beatles, The Byrds and The Rolling Stones and she began to write regular articles on the subject. In early 1967 she visited San Francisco and was one of the first mainstream journalists to write about the nascent hippie movement, filing a landmark story for The Herald on the subject. She also contributed to Oz magazine along with the short lived Eye magazine in the late 1960s.

Through her writings and her interest in pop, she became one of the leading lights of the social and musical scene that centred on the fabled New York music club Max's Kansas City, which was frequented by members of the Andy Warhol circle, Lou Reed and The Velvet Underground, Jim Morrison and many others.

Roxon appears briefly, as an interviewed member of the audience in the film Celebration at Big Sur, filmed at the 1969 Big Sur Folk Festival.

Rock criticism
Her articles about the burgeoning rock scene are now credited as being foundation stones of serious rock writing, and she has since been described by other leading critics as "the mother of rock". She was friendly with many leading music stars but rarely became personally involved. Although she looked young enough to mix easily with the rock crowd, she was at least ten years older than most of the musicians she wrote about.

Unusually for the time, she did not smoke or take drugs and only rarely drank alcohol. These factors, together with her renowned wit, combined to give her writing a degree of ironic detachment that influenced many younger rock writers. She was one of the first mainstream journalists to treat popular music with any degree of seriousness and to regard it not as a trivial "flash in the pan" but as an important social phenomenon.

During the late 1960s and early 1970s, Roxon became close friends with critic and rock manager Danny Fields, Village Voice journalist Blair Sabol, musician and writer Lenny Kaye (later the guitarist in Patti Smith's band and compiler of the original Nuggets LP), photographers Linda McCartney and Leee Black Childers and Australian academic, author and feminist Germaine Greer.

In 1965 she was joined by Sydney Morning Herald's autocratic foreign correspondent Margaret Jones. It was a clash of two unbending personalities which her biographer Robert Milliken described as "like two sopranos sharing the same stage". Perhaps to keep these two apart, Margaret was posted to Washington the following year.

Roxon also played host to many Australians who visited the city, including The Easybeats and singer Lynne Randell and artists including Clifton Pugh. Australian singer Helen Reddy credits Roxon for her first awareness of the women's movement and for providing much of the impetus for co-writing her international hit, "I Am Woman".

Linda McCartney (then Linda Eastman) was one of Roxon's closest female friends and she did much to further Eastman's career, but the friendship ended abruptly in 1969 when Eastman moved to London, married Paul McCartney and cut all ties with all her former friends, a move which wounded Roxon deeply.

Lillian eventually retaliated, four years later, with her famously scathing review of the McCartneys' first American TV special. Published in the New York Sunday News on 22 April 1973, Roxon's review panned the documentary and poured scorn on Linda, slamming her for being "catatonic with horror at having to mingle with ordinary people", "disdainful if not downright bored ... her teeth relentlessly clamped in a Scarsdale lockjaw", and "incredibly cold and arrogant".

Lillian Roxon's Rock Encyclopedia
During 1968-69 Roxon was commissioned to write what became the world's first rock encyclopaedia, published by Grosset & Dunlap in late 1969 and the work for which she is best remembered.

The work had to be written concurrently with her regular duties as the Herald correspondent and other press commitments. The punishing schedule took a heavy toll on her health and she developed asthma.

Lillian Roxon's Rock Encyclopedia was reissued in 1978, updated by Ed Naha.

1970s
In the early 1970s Roxon's profile expanded and she became more widely known for her feminist stance. She wrote a groundbreaking and highly personal report about the August 1970 women's rights march in New York, which was published in The Sydney Morning Herald under the title "There is a tide in the affairs of women". She wrote a regular column on sex and sexuality for Mademoiselle magazine (which continued after her death) and during 1971 she hosted a rock radio show that was syndicated to 250 stations. She met and became friends with David Bowie and his first wife Angie on Bowie's first tour of the US in late 1972 and was a major champion of Bowie's music in the American press as he was trying to break into the U.S. market.

Roxon's health declined during the early 1970s. She made what would be her last visit home to Australia in early 1973 and while she was in Sydney in early February she was interviewed by ABC journalists Jeune Pritchard and Gary Hyde for the ABC's pop magazine program  GTK. The shorter Jeune Pritchard interview was included in a special on the current Australasian tour by The Rolling Stones, and showed Roxon looking obviously puffy and unwell. In the longer Gary Hyde interview Roxon was questioned about the current state of rock music in general; in response to Hyde's questions about up-and-coming acts, she nominated The New York Dolls and the then-unknown Bette Midler as names to watch, and concluded the interview by making a self-deprecating joke about her weight. Both clips are currently (May 2009) available for viewing on the YouTube video-sharing website. 

One of Roxon's last print articles reported on the landmark New York concerts at Max's Kansas City by Iggy Pop and The Stooges and her final piece, filed in early August, was on rising British glam rock star Marc Bolan.

Roxon wrote a novel, loosely based on her years in Sydney, which was never published. This manuscript now resides in Sydney's Mitchell Library, State Library of New South Wales, along with her large collection of letters and other papers, donated by her family and her close friend, the film producer, Margaret Fink.

Death
Lillian Roxon died at the age of 41 on 10 August 1973, after suffering a severe asthma attack in her New York apartment. She was survived by two brothers Jack and Milo. Both parents predeceased her and she never married or had children.

Her niece, Nicola Roxon was the Attorney-General of Australia from 2012 to 2013.

Roxon Place, in the Canberra suburb of Gilmore with a tradition of street names honouring journalists, is named in her honour.

Biography and documentary
In August 2002, a biography of Lillian Roxon was published in Australia by Black Inc.: Lillian Roxon, Mother of Rock, written by the Sydney-based journalist and author Robert Milliken.

A documentary film entitled Mother of Rock: Lillian Roxon, written and directed by Paul Clarke, premiered at the 2010 Melbourne International Film Festival and was partly financed by the Festival's Premiere Fund.

Depictions in the media
In Lily Brett's 2012 novel Lola Bensky, based on Brett’s own experience as a music journalist, Lola meets Lillian Roxon.

In the 2017 miniseries Friday On My Mind, The Easybeats travel to New York in 1967 and meet Lillian Roxon, portrayed by Ella Scott Lynch.

The 2019 film I Am Woman depicts Helen Reddy's friendship with Lillian Roxon, portrayed by Tilda Cobham-Hervey and Danielle Macdonald.

References

External links
 Interview with biographer Robert Milliken
 More information about the documentary Mother of Rock Retrieved 27 October 2016

1932 births
People from Alassio
Australian feminist writers
Australian music journalists
Australian music critics
People educated at Brisbane State High School
Australian Jews
1973 deaths
Australian women journalists
20th-century Australian women writers
Australian women music critics
Women writers about music
20th-century Australian journalists
The Sydney Morning Herald people